Hilton New Orleans Riverside, located at 2 Poydras Street in the Central Business District of New Orleans, Louisiana, is a 29-story, -tall skyscraper hotel. The hotel is the city's largest hotel, containing 1,700 rooms. The hotel is owned by Park Hotels & Resorts and is managed by Hilton Worldwide as part of the Hilton Hotels & Resorts chain. A portion of the building complex overlooks the Mississippi River front. The building is connected via an enclosed pedestrian walkway with the adjacent Outlet Collection at Riverwalk, and is located next to the Ernest N. Morial Convention Center.

Musician Pete Fountain had a club where he performed regularly in the Hilton for some 20 years up to 2003.

The hotel was evacuated during Hurricane Katrina. Most people were taken to Baton Rouge, where friends and family waited. Anyone who wasn't able to get picked up by friends or family were taken to other Hilton hotels in Houston, Dallas, San Antonio and Austin, TX. The hotel reportedly sheltered up to 5,000 people during the hurricane.

See also
 List of tallest buildings in New Orleans
List of tallest buildings in Louisiana

References

External links
 Hilton New Orleans Riverside hotel

Skyscraper hotels in New Orleans
Hotel buildings completed in 1977
New Orleans Riverside
1977 establishments in Louisiana